Hans Karl Georg von Kaltenborn-Stachau (23 March 1836, in Magdeburg – 16 February 1898, in Braunschweig) was a Prussian General of the Infantry and Minister of War.

Biography
He belonged to the aristocratic Kaltenborn-Stachau family, and was raised in the cadet corps, before joining the 27th Infantry Regiment as a Second Lieutenant in 1854. From 1857 to 1860 he attended the Allgemeine Kriegsschule (the "General War College", which later became the Prussian Military Academy) and in 1861 was assigned for 3 years to the Topographical Department of the Great General Staff.

Kaltenborn-Stachau participated in the Second Schleswig War in 1864 and in December was transferred to the general staff of the VI Army Corps. In this position he served in the Austro-Prussian War in 1866, after being promoted to Captain in 1865. In 1868 he became a company commander in the 94th Regiment, and in 1869 a general staff officer in the VII Army Corps.

After being promoted to Major, he then served in the Franco-Prussian War in 1870–71. In 1874 he became commander of a battalion in the Grenadierregiment Nr. 2, and was made a Colonel in 1878. After commanding the 53rd Infantry Regiment, he took over the Kaiser-Alexander-Gardegrenadierregiment, and in 1884 became Chief of Staff of the Guards Corps, and a Major General. In November 1885 he became commander of the 2nd Guards Infantry Brigade and in January 1888 was given command of the 3rd Division. In July of that year he was made commander of the 2nd Guards Infantry Division and was simultaneously promoted to Lieutenant General.

His appointment as Prussian Minister of War occurred on 4 October 1890. In 1893, under his leadership a plan was enacted whereby the army was expanded by 70,000 men, and the length of service was increased to two years. Kaltenborn-Stachau resigned from his office on 12 October 1893.

Honours and awards

References

1836 births
1898 deaths
German untitled nobility
Generals of Infantry (Prussia)
Prussian people of the Austro-Prussian War
German military personnel of the Franco-Prussian War
Recipients of the Iron Cross (1870), 1st class
Knights Grand Cross of the Order of Saints Maurice and Lazarus
Recipients of the Order of the Crown (Italy)
Knights of the Order of Franz Joseph
Grand Crosses of the Military Merit Order (Bavaria)
Grand Crosses of Military Merit
Grand Crosses of the Order of the Dannebrog
Recipients of the Order of the Netherlands Lion
Recipients of the Order of St. Anna, 1st class
Commanders Grand Cross of the Order of the Sword
Grand Crosses of the Order of the Crown (Romania)
Military personnel from Magdeburg